The 1989 UCI Road World Championships took place in Chambéry, France.

Events summary

References

 
UCI Road World Championships by year
W
UCI Road World Championships 
UCI Road World Championships
R
Sport in Chambéry